CarComplaints.com is an online automotive complaint resource that uses graphs to show automotive defect patterns, based on complaint data submitted by visitors to the site. The complaints are organized into logical groups with data published by vehicle, vehicle component, and specific problem. The average cost to fix, average mileage at failure, common solutions and individual owner comments are shown for each problem group. There is no charge or user signup required to access the complaint data, although user registration is required in order to submit a car complaint.

Recognition
CarComplaints.com was featured in a December 2014 Lifehacker article, Five Best Car Comparison Sites, and also mentioned in several New York Times articles from 2013 to 2015: Ford Windstar Minivans Recalled for a Second Time, Chrysler Owners Sound Off on a Power Defect and Ram Dashboards Cracking.

CarComplaints.com was recommended in a June 2010 report from the Consumer Federation of America titled Consumer Complaint Websites: An Assessment. The CFA's report compared six generic complaint websites but singled out CarComplaints.com as a specialized resource for "consumers interested in automobiles, who should begin with carcomplaints.com." The CFA's recommendation of CarComplaints.com was repeated in media coverage by The New York Times, MSNBC, The Early Show & other news outlets.

CarComplaints.com was also named a "Top 100 Website of 2009" by PC Magazine.

According to CarComplaints.com, the 2002 Ford Explorer is ranked as the "Worst Vehicle on Record", largely due to widespread transmission failure at under 100,000 miles of drive time. It also ranked the 2004 model at #3, the 2003 at #6 and the 2005 at #18.

See also
 Consumer Reports
 TrueDelta
 Epinions.com

References

External links
 CarComplaints.com

Online automotive companies of the United States
American review websites
Internet properties established in 2000
Privately held companies based in Vermont